Economos is a surname of Greek origin. It is an Anglicized form of the word Oikonomos. Notable people with this surname include:

Andrew Economos (born 1982), former American football long snapper
 (1935-2016), Mexican artist of Greek origin

See also

Oikonomou
Economo